Danel is both a surname and a given name. Notable people with the name include:

Alejandro Danel (1791–1865), French soldier
Jean-Pierre Danel (born 1968), French guitarist
Pascal Danel (born 1944), French singer
Danel Castro (born 1976), Cuban baseball player
Danel Sinani (born 1997), Luxembourgian footballer